Vincenzo Colucci (12 October 18461918) was an Italian veterinarian and zoologist.

He was born in Calabria in 1846, and, by the age of five, he had lost both parents (his father, an opponent of the repressive Bourbon rule in the Kingdom of the Two Sicilies, died in prison). His grandfather and uncle arranged for the orphan to have a sound classical education in the town of Cittanova, Calabria, after which he studied in the University of Naples. From there he went to the University of Bologna with the intention of becoming a medical doctor; however, he changed his plans and entered the veterinary school about 1870, where he worked there for the next 15 years, taking on positions of ever-increasing responsibility.  In 1886, he joined veterinary faculty at the University of Parma until 1893, when he moved to the Veterinary school of the University of Pisa, remaining there until his death in 1918. In Cittanova, he is honored by a street named Via Vincenzo Colucci.

Although he usually dealt with normal and pathological histology of domestic animals, he published two papers on regeneration in salamanders. The first, in 1886, described the cellular events during regeneration of extirpated limbs and tails. The second, in 1891, demonstrated that the regenerating lens of the eye arises from the iris; three years later in Germany, Gustav Wolff (1894), without mentioning his Italian colleague, published exactly the same result; Emery (1896)suggested that Wolff learned of Colucci’s work from an abstract on page 174 of Zoologischer Jahresbericht für 1891 (1893), repeated the experiment, and passed it off as his own original discovery a year later. Even so, such lens regeneration has long been called Wolffian and not Coluccian. Significantly, Colucci’s regeneration studies were among the first to examine the phenomenon extensively at the cellular level of organization in any animal.

References
 Ravenna E. 1976. Vinzo Colucci. In: Corriere di Reggio, September 11, 1976, Number 34, pp. 296-302.
 Colucci V. 1886. Intorno alla rigenerazione degli arti e della coda nei tritoni; studio sperimentale. Memorie della Reale Accademia delle Scienze dell’Istituto di Bolonga; Classe di Scienze Fisiche (Series 4) 6:501-566.
 Colucci V. 1891. Sulla rigenerazione parziale dell’occhio nei tritoni; istogenesi e sviluppo; studio sperimentale.  Memorie della Reale Accademia delle Scienze dell’Istituto di Bolonga; Classe di Scienze Fisiche (Series 5) 1:593-629.
 Wolff G. 1894. Bemerkungen zum Dawinismus mit einem experimentellen Beitrag zur Physiologie der Entwicklung. Biologisches Centrlblatt 14:609-620.
 Emery C. 1896. Wer hat die Regeneration der Augenlinse aus dem Irisepithel zuerst erkannt und dargestellt? Anatomischer Anzeiger 12:63-64.
 Anonymous. 1893. Zoologischer Jahresbericht für 1891, page 174.

References 

1846 births
1919 deaths
University of Naples Federico II alumni
People from the Province of Reggio Calabria
Academic staff of the University of Bologna
20th-century Italian zoologists
University of Bologna alumni
19th-century Italian zoologists
Academic staff of the University of Parma
Italian veterinarians
Academic staff of the University of Pisa